A Fext is a mythical undead creature in Slavic mythology. Its origins are found in the terrors of the Thirty Years' War (17th century) in central Europe. It is said that the Fext is invincible to bullets, except bullets made of glass. Some of the great generals of that time were called Fexts because of their assumed immortality.

References
Martin Stejskal, Labyrintem tajemna, aneb Průvodce po magickych mistech Ceskoslovenska (Labyrinth of mystery: Guide to the magical places of Czechoslovakia), Paseka: Prague 1991

Slavic legendary creatures
Undead